Bogen Chapel may refer to:

Bogen Chapel (Evenes), a chapel in Evenes Municipality in Nordland county, Norway
Bogen Chapel (Steigen), a chapel in Steigen Municipality in Nordland county, Norway